Marcelino García Toral (born 14 August 1965), known simply as Marcelino in his playing days, is a Spanish football manager and former player who played as an attacking midfielder.

During a ten-year senior career, he amassed La Liga totals of 74 matches and two goals, all at the service of Sporting de Gijón. He became a manager in 1997, working in the top division with Recreativo, Racing de Santander (two spells), Zaragoza, Sevilla, Villarreal, Valencia and Athletic Bilbao.

Playing career
Born in Villaviciosa, Asturias, Marcelino was irregularly used in his first four professional seasons, at Sporting de Gijón. He did appear in a career-best 33 matches in the 1986–87 campaign, as the club finished fourth in La Liga. His top-flight debut was on 22 December 1985, in a 1–1 away draw against RC Celta de Vigo.

After two Segunda División spells, with Racing de Santander and Levante UD, both ended in relegation, Marcelino moved to the lower leagues with Elche CF. He retired in 1994 at only 28, due to injury.

Coaching career
Marcelino started coaching at 32 with lowly CD Lealtad, also in Asturias. In the early 2000s he worked in Segunda División B, with Sporting's reserves.

From 2003 to 2005, Marcelino was in charge of the first team, finishing fifth and tenth in the second division, then signed with fellow league team Recreativo de Huelva, which he led to promotion in his first season and a comfortable mid-table position in the top tier in the following, which made him the recipient of his first Miguel Muñoz Trophy.

Marcelino resigned at the end of the season and took over at former club Santander, leading the Cantabrians to a best-ever sixth-place finish, with the subsequent qualification to the UEFA Cup. However, on 29 May 2008, he again moved teams, returning to division two and joining Real Zaragoza with the objective of a promotion, which was finally achieved; in the process of signing, he had rejected Valencia CF, and became the country's best paid manager at €2.4 million per year following the departure of Real Madrid's Bernd Schuster.

On 13 December 2009, following a string of poor results (the last a 1–2 home defeat to Athletic Bilbao), Marcelino was fired by Zaragoza, with the Aragonese side nonetheless still above the relegation zone. In early February 2011 he returned to Racing Santander, replacing Miguel Ángel Portugal.

Marcelino was appointed at Sevilla FC for 2011–12. On 6 February 2012, following seven games without a win – the last being a 1–2 home loss against Villarreal CF – and with the Andalusians ranking 11th, he was relieved of his duties.

Marcelino signed with Villarreal on 14 January 2013, returning the team to the top flight at the end of the campaign and going on to subsequently achieve three top-six finishes, which included a fourth place and a semi-final run in the UEFA Europa League in 2015–16.

On 10 August 2016, a few days before the first official match of the season, Marcelino was sacked for differences with the board of directors, particularly over the removal of Mateo Musacchio from club captaincy. On 11 May of the following year, he was named at the helm of Valencia for the upcoming campaign after penning a two-year deal.

Marcelino won the Copa del Rey in his second season at the Mestalla Stadium, defeating FC Barcelona 2–1 in the final held in Seville. On 11 September 2019, however, he was dismissed.

On 4 January 2021, Marcelino was appointed head coach of Athletic Bilbao on a contract until 30 June 2022. In his first three games in charge, he lost against Barcelona in the domestic league and defeated the same adversary and Real Madrid to win the Supercopa de España. He was also on the bench for two Spanish Cup finals in two weeks (the first having been postponed due to the COVID-19 pandemic), losing both.

On 24 May 2022, Marcelino announced he would be stepping down on 30 June.

Managerial statistics

Honours

Player
Spain U20
FIFA U-20 World Cup runner-up: 1985

Manager
Recreativo
Segunda División: 2005–06

Valencia
Copa del Rey: 2018–19

Athletic Bilbao
Supercopa de España: 2020–21
Copa del Rey runner-up: 2019–20, 2020–21

Individual
Miguel Muñoz Trophy: 2006–07, 2017–18
Miguel Muñoz Trophy (Segunda División): 2008–09
La Liga Best Coach: 2017–18
La Liga Manager of the Month: September 2013, September 2015

Notes

References

External links

1965 births
Living people
People from Villaviciosa, Asturias
Spanish footballers
Footballers from Asturias
Association football midfielders
La Liga players
Segunda División players
Segunda División B players
Sporting de Gijón B players
Sporting de Gijón players
Racing de Santander players
Levante UD footballers
Elche CF players
Spain youth international footballers
Spain under-21 international footballers
Spanish football managers
La Liga managers
Segunda División managers
Segunda División B managers
Tercera División managers
Sporting de Gijón managers
Recreativo de Huelva managers
Racing de Santander managers
Real Zaragoza managers
Sevilla FC managers
Villarreal CF managers
Valencia CF managers
Athletic Bilbao managers